is a 2000 vertical scrolling shooter arcade game developed by Takumi and published by Capcom on Sega's NAOMI arcade system board and later ported in 2001 to the Dreamcast console. The arcade version is notable both for its excessive scores (scores in the quintillions are not unheard of), and for using a horizontally aligned monitor (much like Treasure Co. Ltd's Radiant Silvergun), something that is considered rare for a vertical shooter.

Dreamcast version
It added score attack mode, 4-player mode, gallery mode, online ranking features. Online ranking service was ended on 10 December 2003.

Soundtrack
The soundtrack to Giga Wing 2 was released on CD, bundled with the soundtrack to Mars Matrix, both composed by the Japanese composer Yasushi Kaminishi -上西 泰史-. The music is exclusively orchestral, with a chaotic sound to provide atmosphere to the war-torn world in which the game takes place.

Reception

In Japan, Game Machine listed Giga Wing 2 on their March 1, 2001 issue as being the most-successful arcade game of the month.

The Dreamcast version received "average" reviews, a bit more positive than the first Giga Wing, according to the review aggregation website Metacritic. Game Revolution called it "a good game. For a mere $20, you get plenty of mindless old-school fun, albeit for a relatively short time". GameSpot said: "You'd be hard-pressed to find a more visually impressive shooter on the Dreamcast, and the game is highly playable to boot". In Japan, Famitsu gave it a score of 27 out of 40.

References

External links
Takumi GW2 site: arcade, DC
Capcom arcade/DC GW2 site
Sega GW2 site

2000 video games
2001 video games
Arcade video games
Capcom games
Dreamcast games
Multiplayer and single-player video games
Takumi Corporation games
Vertically scrolling shooters
Video games developed in Japan